Goathland railway station is a station on the North Yorkshire Moors Railway and serves the village of Goathland in the North York Moors National Park, North Yorkshire, England. It has also been used in numerous television and film productions (see below). Holiday accommodation is available in the form of a camping coach.

History
This station is on the deviation line opened by the North Eastern Railway in 1865 to avoid the cable-worked Beckhole Incline, which was part of the original 1836 Whitby and Pickering Railway route. It was opened as Goathland Mill, and was so named due to its proximity to the watermill on the Murk Esk river adjacent to the station.

The original Goathland station was located at the head of the incline, where there are still some Y&NM cottages, together with a single W&P one.

The station buildings were to the design of the NER's architect Thomas Prosser and were very similar to those being built concurrently (by the same contractor, Thomas Nelson) on the Castleton to Grosmont section of the Esk Valley Line at Danby, Lealholm, Glaisdale and Egton.  The collection of buildings is very little altered since they were built – the last recorded change (apart from NYMR restoration) was in 1908. A tributary of the River Esk flows close by the station.

Deemed to be uneconomic, the line through the station was closed to passenger traffic in 1965 as part of the Beeching cuts, before reopening in 1973 as part of the North Yorkshire Moors Railway.

Hornby modelled Goathland as part of the Skaledale Junction series, which included the footbridge, waiting room and Hogwarts Express.

Film and television appearances

The station and its environment have appeared in various productions including:
Heartbeat (as Aidensfield station)
The Harry Potter films as the Hogwarts Express station at Hogsmeade
All Creatures Great and Small
The Simply Red video of "Holding Back the Years" from 1985. 
Keeping Mum starring Rowan Atkinson
Carrington starring Emma Thompson and Jonathan Pryce

References

Sources

External links

 Train times and information from the North Yorkshire Moors Railway
Listed Buildings at Goathland Station

Heritage railway stations in the Borough of Scarborough
Heritage railway stations in North Yorkshire
Former North Eastern Railway (UK) stations
Grade II listed buildings in North Yorkshire
Railway stations in Great Britain opened in 1865
Railway stations in Great Britain closed in 1965
Railway stations in Great Britain opened in 1973
North Yorkshire Moors Railway
Thomas Prosser railway stations
Grade II listed railway stations
Beeching closures in England